Eliud, also known as Elihud, was a legendary king of the Britons, as recounted by Geoffrey of Monmouth.  He was preceded by Urianus and succeeded by Cledaucus. He is otherwise unattested.

References
Geoffrey of Monmouth By Evans, Sebastian

Legendary British kings
2nd-century BC legendary rulers